Bahman Mofid (
27 July 1942 – 16 August 2020) was an Iranian actor.

Biography 
Bahman Mofid was born in Garakan, a village near Arak, to father Gholam-Hossein Mofid a stage director and actor. His siblings included Bijan Mofid, a playwright; Ardavan Mofid, an actor; and sister Hengameh Mofid, a poet and songwriter. He started acting in childhood, under the direction of his father.

He died 16 August 2020 after battling cancer.

Filmography
 Qeysar (1969)
 Reza Motorcyclist (Reza Motori) (1970) – directed by Masoud Kimiai, as "Abbas Ghorazeh"
 Raghase-ye Shahr (1970)
 Wood Pigeon (Toghi) (1970) – directed by Ali Hatami
 Se-Ghap (1971)
 Rashid (1971)
 Pol (1971)
 Faryad (1971)
 Dash Akol (1971) as "Kaka Rostam"
 Baba Shamal (1971)
 Reza Haft-khat (1972) as "Reza Haft-khat”
 Khanevade-ye Sarkar Ghazanfar (1972) as "Akbar"
 Ghalandar (1972) as "Davood"
 Agha Mehdi Vared Mishavad (1974)
 Jooje Fokoli (1974)
 Tuti (1978)
 Faryad-e Mojahed (1979)
 Nafas-borideh (1980) as "Jalil"
 Hejrat (1981) as "Abdol"
 Veiled Threat (1989) as "Haji Firuz"
 Once Upon a Time (1999)

Voice acting
 Ice Age: Continental Drift'' (2012).

References

External links

1942 births
2020 deaths
People from Tehran
Male actors from Tehran
Deaths from lung cancer
Iranian male film actors
Iranian male voice actors
Deaths from cancer in Iran
Burials at artist's block of Behesht-e Zahra